The Art Amateur (1879–1903) was an American magazine published in New York in the 19th century. Editors included Montague Marks and John W. Van Oost.

References

External links
 Jstor. The Art Amateur, Vol. 1, No. 1, Jun., 1879 and other issues.

Visual arts magazines published in the United States
Defunct magazines published in the United States
Magazines established in 1879
Magazines disestablished in 1903
Magazines published in New York City